CinemaSonics is the second album by Doug Wimbish, released on May 28, 2008 by Yellowbird Records.

Track listing

Personnel 

Musicians
Milan Cimfe – drums, percussion, producer, mixing, vocals (1)
Nick Coplowe – guitar
Pavel Dirda – piano, keyboards
Pete Lockett – percussion
Skip McDonald – guitar, keyboards, producer
Doug Wimbish – bass guitar, guitar, keyboards, producer, mixing, vocals (1, 2, 5-7, 12)
Additional musicians
Sas Bell – vocals (7)
William S. Burroughs – spoken word (6)
Will Calhoun – drums (6, 10)
Bernard Fowler – producer, vocals (2-4)
Kevin Gibbs – vocals (7)
Hari Haran – backing vocals
Jazzwad – programming (4)
Keith LeBlanc – producer, drums (1)
Jiri Majzlik – trumpet (3, 4)
Stepan Markovic – saxophone (3, 4)
Shara Nelson;- vocals (1, 10)
Petr Ostrouchov – mandolin, banjo
Quartet Apollon – strings (3)
Sister Carol – vocals (11)
Bernie Worrell – keyboards (11)
Dave Flash Wright – saxophone and flute (9)

Technical personnel
Pavel Karlík – mixing, mastering
Adrian Sherwood – producer, mixing
Michal Vaniš – producer, mixing

Release history

References 

2008 albums
Albums produced by Keith LeBlanc
Albums produced by Adrian Sherwood
Doug Wimbish albums